The Nimoo Bazgo Power Project is a run-of-the-river power project on the Indus River situated at Alchi village,  from Leh in the Indian Union Territory of Ladakh. The project was conceived on 1 July 2001 and approved on 8 June 2005, and construction began on 23rd Sept, 2006. The project involves construction of a  concrete dam with five spillway blocks of  each having ogee profile.

Every unit has a  diameter, each  penstocks. The project will be connected to the northern grid through a 220 kV transmission line from Leh to Srinagar (the line is scheduled for commissioning with project commissioning). The project is being developed by National Hydroelectric Power Corporation (NHPC) Ltd., while Bharat Heavy Electricals Ltd. (BHEL) has executed the Electro-Mechanical works.

All the three units of the project have been successfully commissioned. The project was inaugurated on 12 August 2014 by the Prime Minister of India Narendra Modi, in a ceremony attended by senior officials including Chief Minister of Jammu & Kashmir Omar Abdullah, National Security Adviser Ajit Kumar Doval and others.

Notes

Dams completed in 2012
Energy infrastructure completed in 2012
Dams in Ladakh
Run-of-the-river power stations
Dams on the Indus River
Power stations in Ladakh
Buildings and structures in Ladakh
2012 establishments in Jammu and Kashmir